Margret Dünser (27 July 1926 – 5 June 1980) was an Austrian journalist known for her work on those living the High Society lifestyle and who wrote the book High Life.

Her West German tv show , 'V.I.P.-Schaukel', aired between 1971-'80, was watched, at its peak, by about thirty million people, in Germany.

References 

1926 births
1980 deaths
ZDF people
20th-century Austrian journalists